A list of films produced in the Soviet Union in 1922 (see 1922 in film).

1922

See also
 1922 in the Soviet Union

External links
 Soviet films of 1922 at the Internet Movie Database

1922
Soviet
Films